According to Ayyavazhi mythology the situation of the whole Universe changes as the Kaliyan was born, and Thiru Nadana Ula is the part which was told by Sivan in Akilam eight about the universal changes. It consist of 21 Vennpas.

Ayyavazhi mythology